Anne or Ann Carver may refer to:

Anne Carver, character in Arkham Asylum
Ann Carver, character in Ann Carver's Profession